The Peabody Court Apartments are a historic apartment building at 41-43 Linnaean Street in Cambridge, Massachusetts.  The four story Colonial Revival brick building was built in 1922.  The H-shaped building has deep courtyards, and is trimmed with limestone elements, including corner quoins, window sills, and keystone lintels.  It is a well-preserved example of a courtyard apartment block, a style popularized in 1898 by Ralph Adams Cram.

The building was listed on the National Register of Historic Places in 1986.

See also
National Register of Historic Places listings in Cambridge, Massachusetts

References

Buildings and structures in Cambridge, Massachusetts
Apartment buildings on the National Register of Historic Places in Massachusetts
National Register of Historic Places in Cambridge, Massachusetts